Palatas is a surname. Notable people with the surname include:

Cameron Palatas (born 1994), American actor
Nick Palatas (born 1988), American actor, brother of Cameron

See also
Palata (disambiguation)